Megha Mandara is a 1992 Indian Kannada-language romance film directed by K. V. Jayaram and produced by Meenakshi Jayaram. The film is based on the novel of the same name written by H. Girijamma. The film stars Ambareesh, Malashri and Anjana.

The film's music was composed by S. P. Venkatesh and the audio was launched on the Sangeetha banner.

Cast 

Ambareesh
Malashri 
Anjana
Jaggesh
K. S. Ashwath
Lokanath
Rekha Das
M. S. Umesh
Shobha Raghavendra
Dingri Nagaraj
Mysore Lokesh
Sunandha
Shankar Bhat
Baby Vindhya

Soundtrack 
The music of the film was composed by S. P. Venkatesh with lyrics by Prof.Doddarange Gowda.

References 

1992 films
1990s Kannada-language films
Indian romance films
Films based on Indian novels
1990s romance films
Films scored by S. P. Venkatesh